DWRT-AM (990 kHz Metro Manila) was an AM music radio station owned and operated by Trans-Radio Broadcasting Corporation in the Philippines. Since September 9, 2010, the 990 kHz frequency has been airing under the call sign DZIQ-AM, through a blocktime arrangement.

History
The first AM station owned by Trans-Radio Broadcasting Corporation was 980 kHz, which was acquired from Transit Broadcasting Corporation in 1971. Under Trans-Radio, the station became known as DZTR - Radyo Pilipino. DZTR was a music AM station and features celebrities such as Vilma Santos, Tirso Cruz III, German Moreno and others. On September 5, 1976, the station signed off to pave way for the launch of 99.5 RT the following day.

DWRT-AM 990
Trans-Radio returned to AM radio in 1985 and launched DWRT-AM (990 kHz) as 99 Rock, playing AOR. A few years later, it shifted from rock to gospel. In 1994, it changed its format again to news & talk as DWRT 990. Its studios were moved to Caloocan. It aired music, public service & religious programing until it ceased broadcast in 2002. These were the years when Super Radyo DYSS 999 Cebu aired in Metro Manila via weak signal.

Rock 990
In March 2006, the station returned on air as Rock 990, adopting the Classic Rock format. At that time, the studios were moved to Makati. Its music formula started off as an experimental program on its Cebu's sister radio station Y101 as an inspiration by Martha Tuason, and eventually led into the decision to re-open this station. The station utilized a computer backed programming which allowed it to be live streamed over the Internet.

Rock 990 went off air in the first week of November 2006 due to transmitter facilities.

DWRT Nueve Noventa
In December 2008, the station went back on air as Nueve Noventa (Nine-Ninety), after a series of test broadcasts beginning October. It broadcast from 9:30 am – 5:00 pm, playing oldies, Original Pilipino Music (OPM) and love songs, accompanied by a pre-recorded stinger saying, "Ito ang Trans-Radio Broadcasting Corporation ... Nueve Noventa!" (This is Trans-Radio Broadcasting Corporation... Nine-Ninety!). During Christmas 2008, it aired information plugs about Christmas traditions in the Philippines, followed by Christmas songs whether local or foreign. By April 2009, it ceased broadcast temporarily and resumed briefly in July 2009 before going off-air again.

DZIQ-AM

After the national elections of May 2010, Philippine Daily Inquirer acquired the station's blocktime and changed its call sign to DZIQ, branded as Radyo Inquirer. On August 16, 2010, Radyo Inquirer went on the air on terrestrial radio and its official launch was on September 9, 2010. The Inquirer group subsequently acquired TRBC, making it as Inquirer's official broadcast arm.

In July 2013, DZIQ-AM was rebranded as Inquirer Radio, maintaining most of Radyo Inquirer’s format with minor program changes and the use of English similar to the current format of DZRJ 810 AM: The Voice of the Philippines. The move was abandoned after about a year and then in 2015, the station was renamed back as Radyo Inquirer and it changed back to all-Filipino language.

See also
Radyo Inquirer 990
Y 101 Cebu

References

Radio stations established in 1994
Radio stations disestablished in 2010
Modern rock radio stations in the Philippines
1994 establishments in the Philippines
2010 disestablishments in the Philippines
Defunct radio stations in Metro Manila